Hinder is an American rock band.

Hinder or hindrance may also refer to;

 Hinder (surname)
 Hinder, an interference call in the sport of pickleball
 Five hindrances, in Buddhism; mental factors that interfere with meditation
 Steric hindrance, a slowing of chemical reactions resulting from Steric effects